Per Olof Andreas Norlén (born 6 May 1973) is a Swedish politician and member of the Moderate Party who has served as Speaker of the Riksdag since September 2018. He has been a Member of the Riksdag (MP) for Östergötland County since October 2006. Norlén has previously been a member of the Committee on the Constitution, 2014–2018 as chair of the committee.

Career
Following the first sitting of the Riksdag since the 2018 Swedish general election on 24 September, Norlén was elected the Speaker of the Riksdag. After the centre-left Löfven I Cabinet lost a vote of no confidence, Norlén began the task of nominating candidates for Stefan Löfven's successor as Prime Minister, according to the Swedish Instrument of Government. The lengthy work of finding a prime minister that could be tolerated by the Riksdag was concluded on 18 January 2019 when Löfven was appointed for a second term. Norlén was reelected as speaker of the Riksdag on 26 September 2022.

Honours

National honours
 : Swedish Veterans Association (Fredsbaskrarna) Medal of Merit in silver (29 May 2022)

Foreign honours
  : Knight Grand Cross of the Order of Merit of the Italian Republic (14 January 2019)
 : Grand Cross 1st class of the Order of Merit of the Federal Republic of Germany (7 September 2021)
  : Knight Grand Cross of the Order of Isabella the Catholic (16 November 2021)
  : Grand Cross of the Order of the White Rose of Finland (17 May 2022)
  : Grand Cross of the Order of Orange-Nassau (11 October 2022)

References

External links 
Riksdagen: Andreas Norlén (m)
Andreas Norléns webbplats

|-

|-

|-

|-

21st-century Swedish politicians
Members of the Riksdag from the Moderate Party
Speakers of the Riksdag
Living people
1973 births
Politicians from Stockholm
Stockholm University alumni
Linköping University alumni
Members of the Riksdag 2006–2010
Members of the Riksdag 2010–2014
Members of the Riksdag 2014–2018
Members of the Riksdag 2018–2022
Members of the Riksdag 2022–2026